Terry Morrison was the fourth President of Athabasca University from 1985 to 1995. He went on to work for the Asia Development Bank Institute.

References

Presidents of Athabasca University
Living people
Year of birth missing (living people)